It's Christmas Again is an album by the American jazz drummer Max Roach recorded in 1984 for the Italian Soul Note label.

Critical reception

The Allmusic review by Scott Yanow awarded the album 2½ stars stating, "It's Christmas Again is a project that for many did not work, but no matter how you slice it, an intriguing aside to Roach's discography. As he often mixed words with jazz, this is less ambitious than previous works, but could be looked upon as more than a little ambiguous, and certainly a cynical view of a time of the year that should be joyous, but for many is difficult." The Penguin Guide to Jazz commented on the albums links with other material from around the same time: "anyone familiar with this period or who takes the time to listen to these Soul Notes in a structured way will find a great deal of cross-fertilization going on".

Track listing
All compositions by Max Roach
 "It's Christmas Again" – 20:41
 "Christina" – 21:12

Personnel
 Max Roach – drums, keyboards, percussion, vibraphone, voice
 Cecil Bridgewater – trumpet
 Tony Scott – clarinet (track 2)
 Lee Konitz – alto saxophone (track 2)
 Odean Pope – tenor saxophone, voice
 Tomaso Lama – guitar (track 2)
 Tyrone Brown – electric bass guitar

References

Black Saint/Soul Note albums
Max Roach albums
1984 albums